is a male badminton player from Japan.

Career
Sakamoto won the bronze medal in the 2007 BWF World Championships in men's doubles with Shintaro Ikeda. They were defeated in semifinals by Jung Jae-sung and Lee Yong-dae of South Korea, 16–21, 12–21.

Achievement

World Championships 
Men's doubles

References

External links
 BWF Player Profile

Living people
Japanese male badminton players
1979 births
Badminton players at the 2008 Summer Olympics
Olympic badminton players of Japan
University of Tsukuba alumni